Randy Sosin (born 1962) is an American filmmaker, music video producer, and executive. He is known for producing films and documentaries such as Sarah Silverman: Jesus Is Magic, Interscope Presents: The Next Episode, Live!, and Under the Electric Sky. He is also known as the brainchild behind Eminem and 50 Cents' music videos.

As an executive, he has served as an executive at Interscope Records and as a vice president at Insomniac and MTV.

Career
Sosin began his career in 1992 when he joined The End Productions as an executive producer to oversee their music video division.

In 1995, Sosin started working at A&M Records as a senior director of music production, and by 1998 he had been moved to the position of vice president of music video production.

In 2000, Sosin joined Interscope Geffen A&M (IGA), where he served as senior vice president of music video production until 2008. Sosin managed visual material at IGA and commissioned music videos for artists such as Eminem and Marilyn Manson. With the help of Interscope, Sosin produced the 2005 feature concert film, Sarah Silverman: Jesus is Magic, along with Heidi Herzon and Mark Williams.

In 2003, Sosin co-created Interscope Presents: The Next Episode, a Showtime reality-show series about battle rap.

In 2006, Sosin produced Rock Legends: Platinum Weird along with David Stewart and Jimmy Iovine.

In 2007, Sosin executive produced the feature film, Live!, starring Eva Mendes and directed by Oscar-winning filmmaker Bill Guttentag, which premiered at the 2007 Tribeca Film Festival.

From 2010 to 2012, Sosin held the position of senior vice president of talent development and programming at MTV. For a brief period, he also served as the event director of Golden Road Brewery, a Los Angeles-based brewery.

In 2012, Sosin joined Insomniac as senior vice president of visual content, and later became the senior vice president of film and video production.

In 2019, Sosin founded creative content agency, Pro1ific.

Filmography
 Interscope Presents: The Next Episode (2003)
 Sarah Silverman: Jesus Is Magic (2005)
 Live! (2007)
 Under the Electric Sky (2014)

References 

1962 births
Living people
American film producers
American music video producers